The Carduchi were a group of warlike tribes that lived in the mountains near the upper part of the Tigris River, now located in present-day western Kurdistan.

References

Sources 

 

Ancient tribes